Intensity may refer to:

In colloquial use
Strength (disambiguation)
Amplitude
Level (disambiguation)
Magnitude (disambiguation)

In physical sciences

Physics
Intensity (physics), power per unit area (W/m2)
Field strength of electric, magnetic, or electromagnetic fields (V/m, T, etc.)
Intensity (heat transfer), radiant heat flux per unit area per unit solid angle (W·m−2·sr−1)
Electric current, whose value is sometimes called current intensity in older books

Optics
Radiant intensity, power per unit solid angle (W/sr)
Luminous intensity, luminous flux per unit solid angle (lm/sr or cd)
Irradiance, power per unit area (W/m2)

Astronomy
Radiance, power per unit solid angle per unit projected source area (W·sr−1·m−2)

Seismology
Mercalli intensity scale, a measure of earthquake impact
Japan Meteorological Agency seismic intensity scale, a measure of earthquake impact
Peak ground acceleration, a measure of earthquake acceleration (g or m/s2)

Acoustics
Sound intensity, sound power per unit area

Other uses
Value intensity in philosophy and ethics
In video luminous emittance, the luminous flux per unit area (lm/m2 or lux)
Energy intensity, an economic measure of energy consumed per unit of GDP (J/$, etc.)
Carbon intensity, any of several measures of release of carbon into the environment
Floor area ratio, the ratio of the total floor area of buildings on a certain location to the size of the land of that location, or the zoning limit imposed on such a ratio
Intensity (measure theory), the average value a measure assigns to an interval of length one
Exercise intensity, a measure of how much work is done during exercise (% of max heart rate)
Intensity (novel), a 1995 novel by Dean Koontz
Intensity (film), a 1997 made-for-TV movie based on the novel
Intensity (Charles Earland album), 1972
Intensity (Art Pepper album), 1960
Intensity (John Klemmer album), 1973
Intensity!, a 1999 album by The Bambi Molesters
Intensity (video game), a 1988 video game.
"Intensity", a song by Linda Perhacs from the album The Soul of All Natural Things

See also
Brightness